"Everything's Magic" is a song by the American rock band Angels & Airwaves. It was the lead single from their second studio album, I-Empire (2007), released on Geffen Records. The song impacted radio on September 18, 2007. It peaked at number eleven on Billboard Hot Modern Rock Tracks chart in 2007, making it their second-biggest hit.

Critical reception
Aubin Paul from Punknews.org noted how both the bass and guitar lines were similar to The Cure's "Close to Me" and The Edge of U2 respectively but said that the combination works to make for "a memorable and fun song." NME writer Scott Evil said the track had promise with its melody being reminiscent of Blink-182 but found it "suffocated by the sheer bloody dreariness of the delivery."

Charts

References

External links

2007 songs
2007 singles
Songs written by Tom DeLonge
Angels & Airwaves songs
Geffen Records singles